The Departmental Council of Alpes-de-Haute-Provence is the deliberative assembly of the Alpes-de-Haute-Provence department in the region of Provence-Alpes-Côte d'Azur. It consists of 30 members (general councilors) from 15 cantons.

The President of the General Council is Éliane Barreille.

Vice-Presidents 
The President of the Departmental Council is assisted by 9 vice-presidents chosen from among the departmental advisers. Each of them has a delegation of authority.

See also 

 Alpes-de-Haute-Provence
 General councils of France

References

External links 
 Departmental Council of Alpes-de-Haute-Provence (official website)

Alpes-de-Haute-Provence
Departments of Provence-Alpes-Côte d'Azur
Provence-Alpes-Côte d'Azur